Jarrettown is an unincorporated community located in Montgomery County, Pennsylvania, United States.

Bean's 1884 History of Montgomery County, Pennsylvania describes Jarrettown as follows:

Jarrettown is the second largest village, and is situated near the centre of the township, on the Limekiln turnpike, which was constructed in 1851.  It contains a hotel, store, a three-story Odd-Fellows' Hall, two-story public school-house and twenty-one houses.  The post-office was established here in 1866.  Gordon in his "Gazetteer," mentions this place in 1832, as containing five or six dwellings.  The name of the place was derived from Levi Jarrett, the owner of several farms in this vicinity in 1815.  In 1776, John Jarrett was assessed for two hundred and thirteen acres.  The name of Jarrett, like those of Fitzwater and Dresher, has now become extinct in Upper Dublin.

References

External links
Upper Dublin Township
Upper Dublin School District

Upper Dublin Township, Montgomery County, Pennsylvania
Unincorporated communities in Montgomery County, Pennsylvania
Unincorporated communities in Pennsylvania